Bembidion laticeps is a small, fast-moving water beetle in the Trechinae subfamily.

References

External links
Bembidion laticeps on BugGuide

Beetles described in 1858